The Waimangarara River is a river of the Marlborough Region of New Zealand's South Island.

See also
List of rivers of New Zealand

References

Rivers of New Zealand
Rivers of Canterbury, New Zealand